Milborrow Chimney Sweeps is a British chimney sweeps company based in Crawley Down, West Sussex.

History 
The company has been in existence for over 100 years. Kevin Giddings purchased the parent company in November 1982 from Cliff Milborrow based in Caterham, Surrey. Mr Kevin Giddings has since become a respected expert in his field.

From annual maintenance and chimney sweeping to stove installations and industrial boiler cleaning, Blocage and Nest Removal, Camera Surveys, Smoke/Pressure Testing and BS5871 Gas Smoke Test. They also carry on the old tradition of attending Weddings for good luck.

Apart from its headquarters close to Gatwick airport, there are small regional offices throughout the south-east of England covering Surrey, Sussex, Kent and London. The company is HETAS, GAS SAFE, CHAS and Construction Line registered.  All the Chimney Sweeps are HETAS qualified.

Milborrow Chimney Sweeps expanded over time and became one of the largest chimney sweeping company in the United Kingdom. In 2002 Milborrow Chimney Sweeps were granted the Royal Warrant of Appointment by Queen Elizabeth II in 2002. Further, in 2012 they were also awarded a royal warrant by Charles, Prince of Wales.  Now being one of only 180 companies to hold multiple warrants.

References

External links 
 Homepage of Milborrow Chimney Sweeps
 Facebook Page of Milborrow Chimney Sweeps
 Twitter of Milborrow Chimney Sweeps

British Royal Warrant holders
Companies based in West Sussex